Scopula nubifera is a moth of the family Geometridae. It is found in Oman.

References

Moths described in 1998
nubifera
Moths of Asia